I'm Reed Fish is an American romantic comedy film based on a story by Reed Fish, and released theatrically on June 1, 2007. The film was directed by Zackary Adler and stars Alexis Bledel, Jay Baruchel, and Schuyler Fisk. Jay Baruchel won the Best Actor award at the U.S. Comedy Arts Festival in 2007 for his role of Reed Fish. The film was released to DVD on September 4, 2007.

Plot 
Reed Fish has followed in the footsteps of his late father, doing an early-morning radio show with the town's mayor, Maureen, through which the eccentric locals of Mud Meadows voice their complaints and have them addressed. Reed produces the show with his old high school buddy, Frank, and he's engaged to be married to another high school classmate, Kate Peterson, whose dad owns several businesses in town. Reed's plans are upended when his high school sweetheart, Jill, comes back to town. She's supposed to be away at law school, but confides to Reed that she quit school two years earlier, and has been working as a waitress while she fruitlessly pursues a career in music. Reed encourages her to play on Open Mike Night at the local bar. He inspires her to find her voice, which leads to some complications in his relationship with Kate, forcing Reed to reexamine every aspect of his safe, secure life.

Cast 
 Jay Baruchel as Reed Fish
 Alexis Bledel as Kate 
 Schuyler Fisk as Jill
 Victor Rasuk as Frank Cortez
 DJ Qualls as Andrew
 A. J. Cook as Theresa
 Katey Sagal as Maureen
 Chris Parnell as Ralph
 Shiri Appleby as Jill Cavanaugh
 Valerie Azlynn as Kate Peterson
 Blake Clark as Irv
 Reed Fish as John Penner

Reception 
Variety described the film as a "Charming, rural version of a pre-wedding panic...flawlessly in tune to small-town rhythms. Pitch-perfect dialogue, quietly dynamic helming and small-scale action on a widescreen canvas make for a very appealing film." The New York Times called the film "a rural coming-of-age tale that's so laid-back that its cast is almost horizontal." In a 2010 interview, performer Reggie Watts said that he "loved it", describing it as "kind of a like a Ferris Bueller's in the woods."

On Rotten Tomatoes, the film has an approval rating of 52% based on 21 reviews, with an average rating of 5.12/10. The site's critics consensus reads: "Painless if largely unmemorable, I'm Reed Fish fails to distinguish itself from countless other small-town comedies populated by amiably quirky characters." On Metacritic, the film has a score of 36% based on reviews from 8 critics.

References

External links 
 
 DVD Talk on I'm Reed Fish
 Apollo Movie Guide on I'm Reed Fish

2006 films
2006 romantic comedy films
American coming-of-age films
2000s English-language films
Films directed by Zackary Adler
2000s American films